Elections to Test Valley Borough Council were held on 5 May 2011, the same day as the 2011 United Kingdom Alternative Vote referendum. The Conservatives maintained control of the council, with an increased majority.

Candidates and results
Before the election, the council consisted of 33 Conservatives, 14 Liberal Democrats and 1 Independent.

Only the Conservatives contested all 48 seats. The Liberal Democrats contested 43 seats, while Labour contested 14, the UK Independence Party 7 and the Greens 2. There were also 3 independent candidates. Two wards, Bourne Valley and Over Wallop, were uncontested, meaning the Conservative candidates were elected by default.

Despite all 48 seats being up for election, only three changed hands: The Conservatives gained two seats in Andover, both from the Liberal Democrats, and, in the Abbey Ward of Romsey, defeated Independent Sally Lamb, who had been previously elected as a Liberal Democrat.

|-bgcolor=#F6F6F6
| colspan=2 style="text-align: right; margin-right: 1em" | Total
| style="text-align: right;" | 48
| colspan=5 |
| style="text-align: right;" | 43608
| style="text-align: right;" |
|-

Ward results

Abbey

Alamein

Ampfield and Braishfield

Amport

Anna

Blackwater

Bourne Valley

Broughton and Stockbridge

Charlton

Chilworth, Nursling and Rownhams

Cupernham

Dun Valley

Harewood

Harroway

Kings Somborne and Michelmersh

Millway

North Baddesley

Over Wallop

Penton Bellinger

Romsey Extra

St Mary's

Tadburn

Valley Park

Winton

References 

2011 English local elections
2011
2010s in Hampshire